Vada pav, alternatively spelt wada pao,  is a vegetarian fast food dish native to the Indian state of Maharashtra. The dish consists of a deep fried potato dumpling placed inside a bread bun (pav) sliced almost in half through the middle. It is generally accompanied with one or more chutneys and a green chili pepper. Although it originated as an affordable street food in Mumbai, it is now served in food stalls and restaurants across India. It is also called Bombay burger in keeping with its origins and its resemblance in physical form to a burger.

The most famous snack in Mumbai, vada pav is claimed to be a part of the culture of Mumbaikars.

Etymology
Batata vada in Marathi literally means "potato fritter". It is a combination of the word for "potato" (batata) and vada, a type of fried savoury snack. Pav is a derivative of the Portuguese word pão, which means bread.

History
The most common theory of the vada pav's origin is that it was invented in the erstwhile mill-heartland of Central Mumbai. 
Ashok Vaidya of Dadar is often credited with starting the first vada pav stall outside Dadar railway station in 1966. Some sources credit Sudhakar Mhatre who started his business around the same time. One of the earliest kiosks selling vada pav is said to be Khidki Vada Pav, located in Kalyan. It was started in the late 1960s by the Vaze family, who used to hand out vada pavs from a window (Khidki) of their house facing the road.

The carbohydrate-rich snack catered to the cotton mill workers of what was then known as Girangaon. This potato dumpling (batata vada) placed inside a pav was quick to make, cheap (~10-15 paisa in 1971), and much convenient over the batata bhaji and chapati combination, which couldn't be eaten in overcrowded local trains.

Cultural importance
The closing of textile mills in central Mumbai led to turmoil in the 1970s. Shiv Sena, the homegrown party formed during this transformative time, based itself as a party with Mill workers' interests.
The party chief, Balasaheb Thackeray encouraged Marathi people in the 1960s to become entrepreneurs, i.e. start food stalls in ways similar to the South Indians setting up Udupi restaurants. Shiv Sena attempted to physically and ideologically claim the streets through agitations as well as neighborhood-level events such as Vada pav sammelan (Vada pav jamboree). This theme has continued even in the recent years, e.g. the 2009 introduction of Shiv vada pav.

Variations and commercialization
There are over 20,000 stalls selling vada pav in Mumbai. Mumbai alone has many variations of the food based on the locality. Large fast food restaurant chains such as Kunjvihar Jumbo King in Mulund and Goli Vada Pav also primarily serve vada pav. Outside of Mumbai, a variant of vada pav is pav vada which is famous in Nashik.

Annually, August 23 is celebrated as World Vada Paav Day.

Preparation
A boiled potato is mashed and mixed with chopped green chilli and garlic, mustard seeds, and spices (usually asafoetida and turmeric). The mass is then shaped into a ball, dipped into gram flour batter and deep fried. The resultant fritter is served by placing inside a bread bun, accompanied with one or more chutneys and fried green chilli.

Gallery

See also

 Aloo tikki
 Chinese bhel
 List of sandwiches
 Veggie burger
 Misal pav
 Pav bhaji

References

Indian cuisine
Maharashtrian cuisine
Street food in India
Indian fast food
Vegetarian sandwiches
Vegetarian dishes of India